Thomas Liddy (born July 20, 1962) is an American attorney and political candidate in Maricopa County, Arizona. He is the son of the Watergate figure G. Gordon Liddy.

Early life and education
Liddy was born July 20, 1962, in Poughkeepsie, New York. He is the fourth of Gordon and Frances Liddy's five children. The family moved to Maryland in 1970 when Gordon Liddy began to work for President Richard Nixon.

Liddy graduated from the St. Albans School in 1981. He earned a Bachelor of Arts degree in history from Fordham University in 1986 and spent his junior year abroad in Jakarta, where he studied economics and theology and learned to speak Indonesian. After serving in the United States Marine Corps, he returned to Fordham and earned a Juris Doctor in 1992.

Career

Military service 
Liddy was sworn in as a U.S. Marine on December 28, 1982, while at Fordham and attended the Officer Candidates School of the United States Marine Corps in Quantico, Virginia, during the summer.

He was commissioned as a second lieutenant in the Marines in April 1985. He served on active duty from 1986 until 1989. He was an 81mm mortar platoon commander and later the executive officer of Weapons Company 3rd Battalion, 2nd Marines. He served in Camp Lejeune, North Carolina; Okinawa, Japan; South Korea; and the Philippines. Liddy left the Marines in 1989 and returned to Fordham to study law. He remained in the Marine Reserves until 1998.

Legal work 
After law school, he worked in a Washington, D.C. law firm for several years. From 1995 to 1998, he served as deputy counsel of the Republican National Committee, appointed by RNC chairman Haley Barbour. From 2003 to 2004, he served as the chairman of the Maricopa County Republican Party. In 2006, he was appointed by then-Mayor Phil Gordon to serve as chairman of the Phoenix Veterans Commission. Liddy also served as the litigation bureau chief of Maricopa County, where he was responsible for managing special litigation services. He has since worked in the Maricopa County Attorney's Office.

Major cases
 Friendly House v. Whiting, representing Maricopa County Sheriff Joe Arpaio, where he argued before U.S. District Court Judge Susan R. Bolton defending Arizona's controversial S.B. 1070
Melendres v. Arpaio, with co-counsel Tim Casey, defended Sheriff Joe Arpaio and the Maricopa County Sheriff's Office in the three-week racial profiling trial, in the United States District Court for Arizona in the summer of 2012.
In 2020, Liddy defended Maricopa County in Donald J. Trump for President, Inc. vs. Hobbs and Maricopa County. Liddy argued that Sharpie pens and "over votes" were not the reason that former Vice President Biden received more votes than President Trump in the November 3, 2020, election in Maricopa County. Once Maricopa County presented its evidence, the attorney for Donald Trump moved the court to dismiss the lawsuit.
 "Lake v. Hobbs", representing Maricopa County, Liddy argued that Lake lost the election for governor of Arizona not because of voter suppression or printer errors, but because her campaign failed to get enough voters to cast their ballots for her.

2000 congressional election
In 2000, Liddy was a Republican candidate for Arizona's 1st congressional district. He finished fourth in a field of five candidates with 20.70% of the votes. The winner was Jeff Flake with 31.80% who went on to win the seat in the general election.

Media
Liddy was a nationally syndicated conservative talk radio host. Along with Austin Hill, Liddy hosted the Liddy & Hill Show on KFYI from 2003 until moving to KKNT in October 2006. Liddy created "PC Friday" to mock the concept of political correctness and was known for his parody songs, such as "The Day Dan Rather Lied".

Personal life
Liddy married his wife Stacy (née Gretkowski) in 1991 while in law school. Stacy has worked as an elementary school teacher. They have four children and live in Scottsdale, Arizona.

References

American talk radio hosts
Politicians from Poughkeepsie, New York
Living people
1962 births
Politicians from Phoenix, Arizona
Politicians from Scottsdale, Arizona
Arizona Republicans